Netta Engelhardt is an Israeli-American theoretical physicist known for her work resolving the black hole information paradox, concerning the apparent loss of physical information from objects that enter black holes and become transformed into Hawking radiation. She is the Biedenharn Career Development Assistant Professor of Physics at the Massachusetts Institute of Technology.

Education and career
Engelhardt was raised in Jerusalem and Boston and graduated from Brandeis University in 2011 majoring in both physics and mathematics. She completed her Ph.D. at the University of California, Santa Barbara. Her 2016 doctoral dissertation, Emergent geometry from entropy and causality, was supervised by Gary Horowitz.

After postdoctoral research at Princeton University, she joined the Massachusetts Institute of Technology faculty in 2019.

Recognition
Engelhardt was a 2019 winner of the Blavatnik Awards for Young Scientists. She was one of the 2021 winners of the New Horizons in Physics Prize, "for calculating the quantum information content of a black hole and its radiation".

References

External links

Year of birth missing (living people)
Living people
American physicists
American women physicists
Israeli physicists
Israeli women physicists
Brandeis University alumni
University of California, Santa Barbara alumni
MIT Center for Theoretical Physics faculty